The C&C 42 Custom is a Canadian sailboat, that was designed by C&C Design and first built in 1976.

Production
The design was built by C&C Yachts in Canada, starting in 1976, but it is now out of production.

Design
The C&C 42 Custom is a small recreational keelboat, built predominantly of fibreglass, with wood trim. It has a masthead sloop rig, a raked stem, a raised reverse transom, an internally-mounted spade-type rudder controlled by a wheel and a fixed swept fin keel. It displaces .

The design has a PHRF racing average handicap of 78 with a high of 71 and low of 81.

See also
List of sailing boat types

Similar sailboats
Hunter Passage 42
Marlow-Hunter 42SS

References

Keelboats
1970s sailboat type designs
Sailing yachts
Sailboat type designs by C&C Design
Sailboat types built by C&C Yachts